Ana Margarida "Ida" Vieira Álvares (born January 22, 1965) is a retired volleyball player from Brazil.  She competed in three Summer Olympics for Brazil women's national volleyball team, winning the bronze medal in their last, the 1996 Summer Olympics in Atlanta, Georgia.

References
 
 

1965 births
Living people
Brazilian women's volleyball players
Olympic volleyball players of Brazil
Volleyball players at the 1984 Summer Olympics
Volleyball players at the 1992 Summer Olympics
Volleyball players at the 1996 Summer Olympics
Olympic bronze medalists for Brazil
Sportspeople from São Paulo
Olympic medalists in volleyball
Medalists at the 1996 Summer Olympics
Pan American Games silver medalists for Brazil
Pan American Games medalists in volleyball
Volleyball players at the 1991 Pan American Games
Medalists at the 1991 Pan American Games